The 2010 Sandwell Metropolitan Borough Council election took place on 6 May 2010 to elect members of Sandwell Metropolitan Borough Council in the West Midlands, England. One third of the council was up for election and the Labour Party stayed in overall control of the council.

After the election, the composition of the council was:
Labour 56
Conservative 12
Liberal Democrat 4

Background
24 seats were contested in the election with the British National Party contesting every seat for the first time, more than the Liberal Democrats who only stood in 13 seats. Labour were defending over half of the seats being contested, with the deputy leader of the council, Mahboob Hussain in Oldbury ward, being among the councillors standing for re-election.

Election result
The results saw Labour increase their majority on the council after gaining 7 seats. Labour took 2 seats from the Conservatives, 1 from the Liberal Democrats, 2 from the British National Party and 2 from independents. This meant Labour had 56 seats, compared to 12 for the Conservatives and 4 for the Liberal Democrats. Meanwhile, the British National Party losses in Princes End and Tividale meant the party no longer had any seats on the council.

Ward results

References

Sandwell Metropolitan Borough Council election
Sandwell Metropolitan Borough Council election
2010
2010s in the West Midlands (county)